Escape Routes is an American reality television series which aired on NBC.  The six-part reality competition is a joint venture between NBC and Ford Motor Company, and it features the Ford Escape. It premiered on March 31, 2012. Hosting each episode is Rossi Morreale and YouTube star Justine Ezarik (a.k.a. "iJustine")

Content
Over the course of the show, the six two-person teams travel in Ford Escapes to six major U.S. cities, where they compete in various events to earn points towards winning the competition. The show also involves audience participation from users on the show's website. The show has been described as a combination of branded entertainment and social media marketing, with one reviewer describing it as "one giant commercial for the Ford Motor Company".

Cast 

White Team: Brett Lemick and Ross Everett

Black Team: Derek Konzelman and Drew Konzelman

Red Team: Bre Ortola and Tara Rhein

Grey Team: Iris Hill and Terrence Davis

Blue Team: Sharon Montero and Wilson Montero

Yellow Team: Chekesha Johnson and Tiffany Jackson

Ratings 

The series premiere drew 1.12 million viewers and 0.2 Adults 18-49 rating on March 31, 2012. The series rose to 1.17 million viewers and a 0.3 Adults 18-49 rating in its second week. The third episode attained the most viewers with 1.20 million tuning in and 0.2 Adults 18-49 rating on April 14, 2012.

References

External links
 Official NBC website
 Official Ford website

2010s American reality television series
2012 American television series debuts
2010s American game shows
English-language television shows
NBC original programming
2012 American television series endings